Pennsylvania Route 226 (PA 226) is a  state highway located in Conneaut Township, Erie County, Pennsylvania.  The western terminus is at the Ohio state line, where the road continues into that state as State Route 84 (SR 84). The eastern terminus is at U.S. Route 6N (US 6N) west of Albion.

Route description

PA 226 begins at the Ohio border in Conneaut Township in Erie County, where the road continues west into that state as SR 84. From the state line, the route heads northeast on a two-lane undivided road through forested areas with some farms and homes. The road runs through more rural areas as it passes through Tracy. PA 226 makes a curve to the east as it comes to its eastern terminus at US 6N.

Major intersections

See also

References

External links

Pennsylvania Highways: PA 226

226